The Estadio Edgar Peña Gutierrez is a football stadium in Santa Cruz de la Sierra, Bolivia. It opened on 30 October 2015. The stadium has a capacity of 17,000.

References

Football venues in Santa Cruz de la Sierra